The 1972 United States Senate elections were held on November 7, with the 33 seats of Class 2 contested in regular elections. They coincided with the landslide re-election of Republican President Richard Nixon. Despite Nixon's landslide victory, Democrats increased their majority by two seats. The Democrats picked up open seats in Kentucky and South Dakota, and defeated four incumbent senators: Gordon Allott of Colorado, J. Caleb Boggs of Delaware, Jack Miller of Iowa, and Margaret Chase Smith of Maine. The Republicans picked up open seats in New Mexico, North Carolina, and Oklahoma, and defeated one incumbent, William B. Spong Jr. of Virginia.

After the elections, Democrats held 56 seats, and Republicans held 42 seats, with 1 Conservative and 1 independent senator in the chamber as well.  These were the first elections in which all citizens at least 18 years of age (instead of 21, and older) could vote, due to the 1971 passage of the 26th Amendment.

Joe Biden, the 46th president of the United States (2021–present) and 47th vice president (2009–2017), first won election to the United States Senate, defeating J. Caleb Boggs in the election in Delaware.

Results summary

Source:

Gains, losses, and holds

Retirements
Three Republicans and three Democrats retired instead of seeking re-election.

Defeats
Four Republicans and three Democrats sought re-election but lost in the primary or general election.

Change in composition

Before the elections 
After the January 7, 1972, Vermont special election.

Elections results

Race summaries

Special elections during the 92nd Congress 
In these special elections, the winner was seated during 1972 or before January 3, 1973; ordered by election date, then state.

Elections leading to the next Congress 
In these general elections, the winners were elected for the term beginning January 3, 1973; ordered by state.

All of the elections involved the Class 2 seats.

Closest races 
Seventeen races had a margin of victory under 10%:

Alabama

Alaska 

Ted Stevens won re-election to a second term (his first full term) against Democrat Gene Guess.

Arkansas 

Incumbent Democrat John Little McClellan was re-elected.

Colorado 

Incumbent Republican Gordon Allott was defeated by Floyd K. Haskell.

Delaware 

Incumbent Republican J. Caleb Boggs, running for a third term, faced off against future President Joe Biden, then a New Castle County Councilman. Though Boggs was expected to easily win a third term over the then-unknown Biden, it ended up being the closest Senate election in 1972, and Biden narrowly beat out Boggs by a little over three thousand votes, winning what would be his first of seven terms.

Boggs, a longtime Delaware political figure, was considering retirement which would likely have led to a primary campaign between two Republicans, U.S. Representative Pete du Pont and Wilmington Mayor Harry G. Haskell Jr. To avoid the anticipated divisive primary fight, U.S. President Richard M. Nixon helped convince Boggs to run again with full party support.

No other Democrat wanted to run against Boggs besides Biden. Biden's campaign had virtually no money and was given no chance of winning. It was managed by his sister Valerie Biden Owens (who would go on to manage his future campaigns as well) and staffed by other members of his family, and relied upon handed-out newsprint position papers. Biden did receive some assistance from the AFL–CIO and Democratic pollster Patrick Caddell. Biden's campaign issues focused on withdrawal from Vietnam, the environment, civil rights, mass transit, more equitable taxation, health care, the public's dissatisfaction with politics-as-usual, and "change".

During the summer Biden trailed by almost 30 percentage points, but his energetic campaign, his attractive young family, and his ability to connect with voters' emotions gave the surging Biden an advantage over the ready-to-retire Boggs.  Biden won the November 7, 1972, election in an upset by a margin of 3,162 votes.

At the time of the election Biden was a little less than 30 years old; age 30 is a constitutional requirement for the U.S. Senate, and he reached that on November 20, in time for the Senate term beginning January 3. After his election he became the sixth-youngest senator in history.

Georgia 

Seven-term Democrat Richard Russell Jr. died January 21, 1971, and Governor of Georgia Jimmy Carter appointed Democrat David H. Gambrell, the chair of the Georgia Democratic Party as interim senator, pending a special election.

Sam Nunn, a Democratic member of the Georgia House of Representatives, won both the special and the regular elections.  Nunn beat Gambrell in the August 29 special and regular primary run-off elections and he then beat Republican congressman Fletcher Thompson in the November 3 special and regular general elections.

Georgia (special)

Georgia (regular)

Idaho 

The incumbent Republican Leonard B. Jordan retired, and was succeeded by James A. McClure.

Illinois 

Incumbent Republican Charles H. Percy sought re-election. Percy was opposed by: Democratic nominee Roman Pucinski, a Congressman from Illinois's 11th congressional district, Edward C. Gross (SL) and Arnold Becchetti (C).  Percy handily won a second term.

Iowa 

The incumbent Republican Jack Miller was defeated by Dick Clark.

Kansas 

The incumbent Republican James B. Pearson was re-elected.

Kentucky 

The incumbent Republican John Sherman Cooper retired, and was succeeded by Democrat Walter Dee Huddleston.

Louisiana 

In the midst of his campaign for a seventh term, Allen J. Ellender, the President Pro Tempore and chairman of the Appropriations Committee, suffered a fatal heart attack on July 27, 23 days prior to the Democratic primary. Ellender, first elected in 1936 as the permanent successor to the assassinated Huey P. Long, was slated to face former state senator and 1971 gubernatorial candidate J. Bennett Johnston and minor candidate Frank Allen in the primary.

Governor Edwin Washington Edwards, who defeated Johnston by less than 4,500 votes in the 1971 Democratic runoff, nominated his wife, Elaine Edwards, to fill the remainder of Ellender's term, with the agreement Mrs. Edwards would resign immediately following the general election to allow the winner to gain seniority over other new senators.

On the same day as Edwards' inauguration on Capitol Hill, the Louisiana Democratic Party rejected a challenge by former Governor John McKeithen to reopen qualifying following Ellender's death, ordering the primary to be held August 19 as scheduled, ignoring an opinion to the contrary by Louisiana Attorney General William J. Guste Jr. Ellender's name was not removed from the ballot and he received 10 percent of the primary vote as a tribute. McKeithen, whose eight-year gubernatorial tenure ended May 9, 1972, ran as an independent with support of the Ellender family, incensed by Johnston's primary challenge.

Johnston easily won the Democratic primary, nullifying the need for a September 30 runoff. In the general election, the Shreveport native trounced McKeithen by 32 points to win the first of his four terms. He was sworn in November 13, 1972.

Maine 

Massachusetts 

Incumbent Republican Edward Brooke, first elected in 1966 as the first African-American elected to the Senate by popular vote, defeated his challengers, among them: John J. Droney, the Middlesex County District Attorney.

Michigan 

The incumbent Republican Robert P. Griffin was re-elected.

Minnesota 

Incumbent Democrat Walter Mondale, who was originally appointed in 1964 (to fill the vacancy created when Hubert Humphrey was elected to the office of Vice President) and elected to a full term in 1966, defeated Republican challenger Phil Hansen.

Mississippi 

The incumbent Democrat James Eastland was re-elected.

Montana 

Incumbent Democrat Lee Metcalf, who was first elected to the Senate in 1960 and was re-elected in 1966, ran for re-election. After winning the Democratic primary, he moved on to the general election, where he faced Hank Hibbard, a State senator and the Republican nominee. Following a close campaign, Metcalf managed to narrowly win re-election to his third term in the Senate over Hibbard.

Nebraska 

Incumbent Republican Carl Curtis won re-election over former congressman Terry Carpenter.

New Hampshire 

The incumbent Democratic Senator Thomas J. McIntyre was re-elected.

New Jersey 

The incumbent Republican Clifford P. Case was re-elected.

New Mexico 

The incumbent Democratic U.S. Senator Clinton Presba Anderson retired, and was succeeded by Republican Pete Domenici.

North Carolina 

The incumbent Democratic senator B. Everett Jordan was defeated in the primary by Nick Galifianakis. Galifianakis went on to lose the election to Jesse Helms, making Helms the first Republican Senator from the state in the 20th century.

Oklahoma 

The incumbent Democratic Senator Fred R. Harris retired, and was succeeded by Republican Dewey F. Bartlett.

Oregon 

The incumbent Republican Mark Hatfield was re-elected.

Rhode Island 

The incumbent Democratic Senator Claiborne Pell was re-elected.

South Carolina 

The incumbent Republican Strom Thurmond was re-elected.

South Dakota 

The incumbent Republican Karl E. Mundt retired, and was succeeded by James Abourezk.

Tennessee 

One-term Republican Howard Baker was re-elected. He defeated Democrat Ray Blanton.

Texas 

Incumbent Republican John Tower was re-elected.

Vermont (special) 

The special election was held January 7, 1972.  Incumbent Republican Robert Stafford, appointed in September 1971 to fill the vacancy created by the death of Winston L. Prouty, successfully ran for re-election to the remainder of Prouty's term. Stafford defeated Democratic candidate Randolph T. Major. Bernie Sanders, the Liberty Union candidate, was later elected to this seat in 2006, serving as an Independent.

Virginia 

The incumbent Democratic senator William B. Spong Jr. was defeated by Republican William L. Scott, making Scott the first Republican Senator from the state since John F. Lewis in 1870.

West Virginia 

The incumbent Democratic Senator Jennings Randolph was re-elected.

Wyoming 

Incumbent Republican Clifford Hansen was re-elected.

See also
 1972 United States elections
 1972 United States gubernatorial elections
 1972 United States presidential election
 1972 United States House of Representatives elections
 92nd United States Congress
 93rd United States Congress

Notes

References

External links